In mathematics, a differential equation is an equation that relates one or more unknown functions and their derivatives. In applications, the functions generally represent physical quantities, the derivatives represent their rates of change, and the differential equation defines a relationship between the two. Such relations are common; therefore, differential equations play a prominent role in many disciplines including engineering, physics, economics, and biology.

Mainly the study of differential equations consists of the study of their solutions (the set of functions that satisfy each equation), and of the properties of their solutions. Only the simplest differential equations are solvable by explicit formulas; however, many properties of solutions of a given differential equation may be determined without computing them exactly.

Often when a closed-form expression for the solutions is not available, solutions may be approximated numerically using computers. The theory of dynamical systems puts emphasis on qualitative analysis of systems described by differential equations, while many numerical methods have been developed to determine solutions with a given degree of accuracy.

History

Differential equations first came into existence with the invention of calculus by Newton and Leibniz. In Chapter 2 of his 1671 work Methodus fluxionum et Serierum Infinitarum, Isaac Newton listed three kinds of differential equations:

He solves these examples and others using infinite series and discusses the non-uniqueness of solutions.

Jacob Bernoulli proposed the Bernoulli differential equation in 1695. This is an ordinary differential equation of the form

 

for which the following year Leibniz obtained solutions by simplifying it.

Historically, the problem of a vibrating string such as that of a musical instrument was studied by Jean le Rond d'Alembert, Leonhard Euler, Daniel Bernoulli, and Joseph-Louis Lagrange. In 1746, d’Alembert discovered the one-dimensional wave equation, and within ten years Euler discovered the three-dimensional wave equation.

The Euler–Lagrange equation was developed in the 1750s by Euler and Lagrange in connection with their studies of the tautochrone problem. This is the problem of determining a curve on which a weighted particle will fall to a fixed point in a fixed amount of time, independent of the starting point. Lagrange solved this problem in 1755 and sent the solution to Euler. Both further developed Lagrange's method and applied it to mechanics, which led to the formulation of Lagrangian mechanics.

In 1822, Fourier published his work on heat flow in Théorie analytique de la chaleur (The Analytic Theory of Heat), in which he based his reasoning on Newton's law of cooling, namely, that the flow of heat between two adjacent molecules is proportional to the extremely small difference of their temperatures. Contained in this book was Fourier's proposal of his heat equation for conductive diffusion of heat. This partial differential equation is now taught to every student of mathematical physics.

Example
In classical mechanics, the motion of a body is described by its position and velocity as the time value varies. Newton's laws allow these variables to be expressed dynamically (given the position, velocity, acceleration and various forces acting on the body) as a differential equation for the unknown position of the body as a function of time.

In some cases, this differential equation (called an equation of motion) may be solved explicitly.

An example of modeling a real-world problem using differential equations is the determination of the velocity of a ball falling through the air, considering only gravity and air resistance. The ball's acceleration towards the ground is the acceleration due to gravity minus the deceleration due to air resistance. Gravity is considered constant, and air resistance may be modeled as proportional to the ball's velocity. This means that the ball's acceleration, which is a derivative of its velocity, depends on the velocity (and the velocity depends on time). Finding the velocity as a function of time involves solving a differential equation and verifying its validity.

Types
Differential equations can be divided into several types. Apart from describing the properties of the equation itself, these classes of differential equations can help inform the choice of approach to a solution. Commonly used distinctions include whether the equation is ordinary or partial, linear or non-linear, and homogeneous or heterogeneous. This list is far from exhaustive; there are many other properties and subclasses of differential equations which can be very useful in specific contexts.

Ordinary differential equations

Thus  is often called the independent variable of the equation. The term "ordinary" is used in contrast with the term partial differential equation, which may be with respect to more than one independent variable.

Linear differential equations are the differential equations that are linear in the unknown function and its derivatives. Their theory is well developed, and in many cases one may express their solutions in terms of integrals.

Most ODEs that are encountered in physics are linear. Therefore, most special functions may be defined as solutions of linear differential equations (see Holonomic function).

As, in general, the solutions of a differential equation cannot be expressed by a closed-form expression, numerical methods are commonly used for solving differential equations on a computer.

Partial differential equations

A partial differential equation (PDE) is a differential equation that contains unknown multivariable functions and their partial derivatives. (This is in contrast to ordinary differential equations, which deal with functions of a single variable and their derivatives.) PDEs are used to formulate problems involving functions of several variables, and are either solved in closed form, or used to create a relevant computer model.

PDEs can be used to describe a wide variety of phenomena in nature such as sound, heat, electrostatics, electrodynamics, fluid flow, elasticity, or quantum mechanics. These seemingly distinct physical phenomena can be formalized similarly in terms of PDEs. Just as ordinary differential equations often model one-dimensional dynamical systems, partial differential equations often model multidimensional systems. Stochastic partial differential equations generalize partial differential equations for modeling randomness.

Non-linear differential equations

A non-linear differential equation is a differential equation that is not a linear equation in the unknown function and its derivatives (the linearity or non-linearity in the arguments of the function are not considered here). There are very few methods of solving nonlinear differential equations exactly; those that are known typically depend on the equation having particular symmetries. Nonlinear differential equations can exhibit very complicated behaviour over extended time intervals, characteristic of chaos. Even the fundamental questions of existence, uniqueness, and extendability of solutions for nonlinear differential equations, and well-posedness of initial and boundary value problems for nonlinear PDEs are hard problems and their resolution in special cases is considered to be a significant advance in the mathematical theory (cf. Navier–Stokes existence and smoothness). However, if the differential equation is a correctly formulated representation of a meaningful physical process, then one expects it to have a solution.

Linear differential equations frequently appear as approximations to nonlinear equations. These approximations are only valid under restricted conditions. For example, the harmonic oscillator equation is an approximation to the nonlinear pendulum equation that is valid for small amplitude oscillations.

Equation order and degree
The order of the differential equation is the order of the highest derivative of the unknown function that appears in it. When a differential equation is written as a polynomial equation in the unknown function and its derivatives, its degree is, depending on the context, the degree in the highest derivative of the unknown function, or its total degree in the unknown function and its derivatives. In particular, a linear differential equation has degree one for both meanings, but the non-linear differential equation  is of degree one for the first meaning but not for the second one.

An equation containing only first derivatives is a first-order differential equation, an equation containing the second derivative is a second-order differential equation, and so on.

Differential equations that describe natural phenomena almost always have only first and second order derivatives in them, but there are some exceptions, such as the thin-film equation, which is a fourth order partial differential equation.

Examples

In the first group of examples u is an unknown function of x, and c and ω are constants that are supposed to be known. Two broad classifications of both ordinary and partial differential equations consist of distinguishing between linear and nonlinear differential equations, and between homogeneous differential equations and heterogeneous ones.
 Heterogeneous first-order linear constant coefficient ordinary differential equation:
 
 Homogeneous second-order linear ordinary differential equation:
 
 Homogeneous second-order linear constant coefficient ordinary differential equation describing the harmonic oscillator:
 
 Heterogeneous first-order nonlinear ordinary differential equation:
 
 Second-order nonlinear (due to sine function) ordinary differential equation describing the motion of a pendulum of length L:
 

In the next group of examples, the unknown function u depends on two variables x and t or x and y.
 Homogeneous first-order linear partial differential equation:
 
 Homogeneous second-order linear constant coefficient partial differential equation of elliptic type, the Laplace equation:
 
 Homogeneous third-order non-linear partial differential equation, the KdV equation:

Existence of solutions

Solving differential equations is not like solving algebraic equations. Not only are their solutions often unclear, but whether solutions are unique or exist at all are also notable subjects of interest.

For first order initial value problems, the Peano existence theorem gives one set of circumstances in which a solution exists. The solution may not be unique. (See Ordinary differential equation for other results.)

However, this only helps us with first order initial value problems. Suppose we had a linear initial value problem of the nth order:

such that

Related concepts
 A delay differential equation (DDE) is an equation for a function of a single variable, usually called time, in which the derivative of the function at a certain time is given in terms of the values of the function at earlier times.
 An integro-differential equation (IDE) is an equation that combines aspects of a differential equation and an integral equation.
 A stochastic differential equation (SDE) is an equation in which the unknown quantity is a stochastic process and the equation involves some known stochastic processes, for example, the Wiener process in the case of diffusion equations.
 A stochastic partial differential equation (SPDE) is an equation that generalizes SDEs to include space-time noise processes, with applications in quantum field theory and statistical mechanics.
 An ultrametric pseudo-differential equation is an equation which contains p-adic numbers in an ultrametric space. Mathematical models that involve ultrametric pseudo-differential equations use pseudo-differential operators instead of differential operators.
 A differential algebraic equation (DAE) is a differential equation comprising differential and algebraic terms, given in implicit form.

Connection to difference equations

The theory of differential equations is closely related to the theory of difference equations, in which the coordinates assume only discrete values, and the relationship involves values of the unknown function or functions and values at nearby coordinates. Many methods to compute numerical solutions of differential equations or study the properties of differential equations involve the approximation of the solution of a differential equation by the solution of a corresponding difference equation.

Applications

The study of differential equations is a wide field in pure and applied mathematics, physics, and engineering. All of these disciplines are concerned with the properties of differential equations of various types. Pure mathematics focuses on the existence and uniqueness of solutions, while applied mathematics emphasizes the rigorous justification of the methods for approximating solutions. Differential equations play an important role in modeling virtually every physical, technical, or biological process, from celestial motion, to bridge design, to interactions between neurons. Differential equations such as those used to solve real-life problems may not necessarily be directly solvable, i.e. do not have closed form solutions. Instead, solutions can be approximated using numerical methods.

Many fundamental laws of physics and chemistry can be formulated as differential equations. In biology and economics, differential equations are used to model the behavior of complex systems. The mathematical theory of differential equations first developed together with the sciences where the equations had originated and where the results found application. However, diverse problems, sometimes originating in quite distinct scientific fields, may give rise to identical differential equations. Whenever this happens, mathematical theory behind the equations can be viewed as a unifying principle behind diverse phenomena. As an example, consider the propagation of light and sound in the atmosphere, and of waves on the surface of a pond. All of them may be described by the same second-order partial differential equation, the wave equation, which allows us to think of light and sound as forms of waves, much like familiar waves in the water. Conduction of heat, the theory of which was developed by Joseph Fourier, is governed by another second-order partial differential equation, the heat equation. It turns out that many diffusion processes, while seemingly different, are described by the same equation; the Black–Scholes equation in finance is, for instance, related to the heat equation.

The number of differential equations that have received a name, in various scientific areas is a witness of the importance of the topic. See List of named differential equations.

Software 
Some CAS software can solve differential equations. These CAS software and their commands are worth mentioning:
 Maple: dsolve
 Mathematica: DSolve[]
 Maxima: ode2(equation, y, x)
 SageMath: desolve()
 SymPy: sympy.solvers.ode.dsolve(equation)
 Xcas: desolve(y'=k*y,y)

See also

 Exact differential equation
 Functional differential equation
 Initial condition
 Integral equations
 Numerical methods for ordinary differential equations
 Numerical methods for partial differential equations
 Picard–Lindelöf theorem on existence and uniqueness of solutions
 Recurrence relation, also known as 'difference equation'
 Abstract differential equation
 System of differential equations

References

Further reading
 
 
 
 
 
  In University of Michigan Historical Math Collection

External links

 
 Lectures on Differential Equations MIT Open CourseWare Videos
 Online Notes / Differential Equations Paul Dawkins, Lamar University
 Differential Equations, S.O.S. Mathematics
 Introduction to modeling via differential equations Introduction to modeling by means of differential equations, with critical remarks.
 Mathematical Assistant on Web Symbolic ODE tool, using Maxima
 Exact Solutions of Ordinary Differential Equations
 Collection of ODE and DAE models of physical systems MATLAB models
 Notes on Diffy Qs: Differential Equations for Engineers An introductory textbook on differential equations by Jiri Lebl of UIUC
 Khan Academy Video playlist on differential equations  Topics covered in a first year course in differential equations.
 MathDiscuss Video playlist on differential equations